Helmut Barysz (31 August 1916 – c. January 1945) was a Polish swimmer. He competed in the men's 4 × 200 metre freestyle relay at the 1936 Summer Olympics. He went missing in action during World War II, and was declared dead in 1952.

References

External links
 

1916 births
1945 deaths
Polish male freestyle swimmers
Olympic swimmers of Poland
Swimmers at the 1936 Summer Olympics
Place of birth missing
Polish military personnel killed in World War II
Missing in action of World War II
People declared dead in absentia